The 2010 Grand Prix Cycliste de Québec was the first edition of the Grand Prix Cycliste de Québec, one-day professional bicycle road race held in Québec City, Quebec, Canada. It was held on September 10 as the penultimate event in the 2010 UCI ProTour. With the 2010 Grand Prix Cycliste de Montréal held two days later on September 12, 2010, the 2010 edition was one of only two stops in North America for the 2010 UCI ProTour.
It is part of the UCI World Ranking.

Course
The course consisted of 15 laps a 12 km circuit. During the International Cycling Union's visit in 2009, they ranked the course as "demanding" from a technical point of view as Québec City is very hilly, and "exceptional" for the beauty of its setting.

This circuit was well-suited for climbers and those who are used to steep descents. The finish was on an uphill climb.

Teams
Twenty One teams had been invited to the 2010 Grand Prix Cycliste de Québec

Teams from the UCI Pro Tour

Teams awarded a wildcard invitation

Results

References

External links
 

Grand Prix Cycliste De Quebec
2010
Grand Prix Cycliste De Quebec
Grand Prix Cycliste de Quebec
2010 in Quebec
2010s in Quebec City